Victorio Miranda Saludar (born 3 November 1990) is a Filipino professional boxer who held the WBO mini-flyweight title from 2018 to 2019 and the WBA (Regular) mini-flyweight title in 2021.

Amateur career
Saludar was a successful amateur. He's a six-time national amateur champion in the flyweight division, and he won a bronze medal at the 2010 Asian Games, after losing in the semifinals to Birzhan Zhakypov. Saludar's two brothers are also boxers. Rey Saludar won a gold medal at the 2010 Asian Games, and Froilan Saludar is a former world-title challenger.

Professional career

Early career
Saludar made his professional debut against Juanito Hundante on 13 July 2013, and won the fight by a first-round technical knockout. He amassed an 11-1 record during the next two years, most notably defeating Rizky Pratama by a first-round technical knockout to win the vacant WBO Asia Pacific mini-flyweight title.

WBO mini flyweight champion
Saludar was scheduled to challenge the reigning WBO mini flyweight champion Ryuya Yamanaka, in the latter's second title defense. The fight was scheduled for 13 July 2018, to be contested at the Central Gym in Kobe, Japan. Saludar was at the time the #3 ranked WBO mini flyweight contender. He won the fight by unanimous decision, with scores of 116-111, 117-110 and 115-112. Saludar knocked Yamanaka with a straight right in the seventh round and had, by the end of the bout, opened a cut above Yamanaka's left eye.

Saludar made his first WBO mini flyweight title defense against Masataka Taniguchi on 26 February 2019, at the Korakuen Hall in Tokyo, Japan. He won the fight by a wide unanimous decision, with two judges scoring the fight 117-111 in his favor, while the third judge awarded him a 118-110 scorecard.

Saludar made his second WBO title defense against Wilfredo Méndez on 24 August 2019, at the Puerto Rico Convention Center in San Juan, Puerto Rico. Saludar was seen as the favorite to retain the title when the bout was first scheduled. Saludar entered the bout without his usual cornermen, as his coach Jojo Palacios was unable to secure a working visa, while his manager Kenneth Rondal was forced to stay in the Philippines due to his father's recent brain surgery. Mendez won the fight by unanimous decision, with scores of 117-110, 115-112, 116-111.

WBA Regular champion
Saludar was scheduled to face Mike Kinaadman in his first post-title fight on 21 December 2019, and was held at the Enan Chiong Activity Center in Naga, Philippines. He suffered a flash knockdown in the first round, but quickly rebounded to stop Kinaadman by knockout in the sixth round.

Saludar was scheduled to face Robert Paradero for the vacant WBA Regular mini-flyweight title on 19 February 2021, at the Biñan Football Stadium in Biñan, Philippines. The fight was originally planned for 26 September 2020, in Manila, but was eventually pushed back due to the COVID-19 pandemic. Saludar won the fight by split decision, with two judges awarding Saludar 115-113 and 116-112 scorecards, while the third judge score the bout 118-110 for Paradero.

On 30 August 2021, the WBA ordered Saludar to face the number 1 ranked mini flyweight contender Erick Rosa in a mandatory title fight. The two of them were given 30 days to negotiate the terms of the bout, before it would head to a purse bid. They came to terms on 9 September, and announced the fight for 9 December 2021, to be held in Santo Domingo, Dominican Republic. The fight was later postponed for 21 December 2021 Saludar lost the fight by split decision, with scores of 109-116, 112-113 and 113-112.

Later mini flyweight career
Saludar faced Oscar Collazo in a WBA mini-flyweight title eliminator on the undercard of the Javier Fortuna lightweight bout, which took place on 16 July 2022. He lost the fight by unanimous decision, with score of 116–112, 116–112 and 118–110.

Saludar faced Ariston Aton for the vacant Asian Boxing Federation minimumweight title on 21 December 2021. He captured the vacant belt by a seventh-round knockout.

Professional boxing record

Personal life
Saludar has a wife named Jonalyn. He also has a son and a daughter.

See also
List of mini-flyweight boxing champions
History of boxing in the Philippines

References

External links

1990 births
Living people
Filipino male boxers
Boxers from South Cotabato
World mini-flyweight boxing champions
World Boxing Association champions
World Boxing Organization champions
Medalists at the 2010 Asian Games
Asian Games bronze medalists for the Philippines
Boxers at the 2010 Asian Games
Asian Games medalists in boxing